The Second Doctor comic stories is a range of offscreen adventures featuring the second incarnation of the Doctor, the hero of BBC 1's longrunning science fiction series Doctor Who. They initially appeared in TV Comic.

History 
The TV Comic version of the First Doctor had had as companions John and Gillian. In 1966, when the Doctor changed his appearance on television and in comics, TV Comic has these characters traveling with the "new" Doctor. They were soon replaced with Jamie McCrimmon, to better match televised  Doctor Who.

After the concluding Second Doctor television series aired, The War Games, TV Comic continued to print comics featuring the Second Doctor. The stories followed on from the end of that serial, in which the Doctor's people, the Time Lords had exiled him to the 20th century and deemed that he should change his appearance. These stories ignored the second part of the sentence and had the Second Doctor living on Earth with his old body, at least until the concluding story, in which agents of the Time Lords forced the Doctor to regenerate.

Fans would later use these stories as evidence for a fan theory concerning "Season 6B", first discussed for a wide audience in the 1995 episode guidebook The Discontinuity Guide written by Paul Cornell, Martin Day, and Keith Topping.

The Second Doctor has returned for comics printed in Doctor Who Magazine, IDW Publishing and Titan Comics.

Polystyle comic strips

TV Comic

TV Comic Holiday Special

TV Comic Annuals

Doctor Who Annuals

Doctor Who Magazine comic strips

Doctor Who Magazine and Doctor Who Magazine Specials

Special Appearance

See also 
 List of Doctor Who comic stories
 First Doctor comic stories
 Third Doctor comic stories
 Fourth Doctor comic strips
 Fifth Doctor comic stories
 Eighth Doctor comic stories
 War Doctor comic stories
 Ninth Doctor comic stories
 Sixth Doctor comic stories
 Seventh Doctor comic stories
 Tenth Doctor comic stories
 Eleventh Doctor comic stories
 Twelfth Doctor comic stories

External links 
 http://www.drwhoguide.com/tvcomic2.htm
 http://alteredvistas.co.uk/html/comic_strip_index.html#2nd

Comics based on Doctor Who
Second Doctor stories